Bylot is an unincorporated area and railway point in Census division 23 in Northern Manitoba, Canada.

History
Bylot was founded with the building of the Hudson Bay Railway in the third decade of the 20th century. When the originally intended final section line route to Port Nelson was abandoned, the construction of the new route of the final section from Amery north to Churchill, which opened in 1929, led to its founding.

Transportation
Bylot is the site of Bylot railway station, served by the Via Rail Winnipeg–Churchill train.

References

Unincorporated communities in Northern Region, Manitoba